Stagshaw may refer to:
Stagshaw Garden, garden near Ambleside, Cumbria, England, owned by National Trust
Stagshaw, a 1923 steam locomotive stored at Tanfield Railway in North East England
Stagshaw Roundabout, location near the Portgate Roman remains in Northumberland, England
Stagshaw, a station of the BBC Regional Programme serving the North East of England and Cumbria from 1937
Stagshaw, a ship which was wrecked on 9 February 1848
Stagshaw, a ship which was wrecked on 27 January 1850
Stagshaw, a ship which was wrecked on 8 June 1871
Stagshaw, a ship which was wrecked on 4 November 1878